Magadheera is a 2009 Indian Telugu-language film directed by S. S. Rajamouli, and produced by Allu Aravind and B. V. S. N. Prasad. The film stars Ram Charan and Kajal Aggarwal, with Dev Gill and Srihari in supporting roles. It was edited by Kotagiri Venkateswara Rao and the cinematographer was K. K. Senthil Kumar. The visual effects were designed by R. C. Kamalakannan, with assistance from Adel Adili and Pete Draper. Magadheera is the first Telugu film to list a "visual effects producer" in its credits. The film's soundtrack was composed by M. M. Keeravani, who collaborated with Kalyani Malik to score the background music. The film revolves around four people who lived in the 17th century; they die before their wishes are fulfilled and are reborn after 400 years. It remained the highest-grossing Telugu film ever for five years until its takings were exceeded by those of Attarintiki Daredi in 2013. The film garnered awards and nominations in several categories; it was particularly praised for its direction, performances of the film's cast, cinematography, and visual effects. As of December 2010, the film has won forty-three awards.

At the 57th National Film Awards, Magadheera won the awards for Best Choreography and Best Special Effects. The film won nine awards at the 2010 Nandi Awards ceremony, including those for Best Popular Feature Film, Best Director and Best Special Effects. At the 57th Filmfare Awards South ceremony it won six awards, including the awards for Best Film, Best Director, and Best Actor, from ten nominations. Aggarwal and Srihari also garnered nominations for Best Actress and Best Supporting Actor, respectively. Magadheera received thirteen nominations at the 2010 CineMAA Awards ceremony and won eleven awards, including those for Best Film, Best Director, Best Actor, and Best Cinematography. Aggarwal and Keeravani were nominated for Best Actress and Best Music Director, respectively. The film received ten nominations at the 2010 South Scope Cine Awards ceremony and won six awards, including those for Best Film, Best Director, Best Actor, and Best Cinematography.

Accolades

See also 

 List of Telugu films of 2009
 Magadheera (soundtrack)

Notes

References

External links 

 

Magadheera